The Juno Award for Artist of the Year is an annual award presented by the Canadian Academy of Recording Arts and Sciences (CARAS) to the best individual musician in Canada. The five nominees in the category are decided through a combination of sales and CARAS member voting, and the recipient is chosen from among these nominees by member voting.

Prior to 2003, male and female artists were nominated and awarded in separate categories. The award was also known as Best Male Artist and Best Female Artist (2000–2002), Best Male Vocalist and Best Female Vocalist (1970–1974, 1999), and Male Vocalist of the Year and Female Vocalist of the Year (1975–1998).

Achievements

With nine wins and 20 nominations, Nova Scotian singer Anne Murray is both the most awarded and most nominated artist in this category, and was also nominated for a record twelve years in a row, from 1979 to 1991 (excluding 1988, when no ceremony was held). Rock musician Bryan Adams is the winningest male in the category, with seven wins, including a record five wins in a row from 1983 to 1987. Neil Young is the most nominated male with 14 total nominations, and is also remarkable for the 32 years between his first nomination in 1979 and his most recent win in 2011.

Maestro Fresh-Wes was the first hip-hop/rap artist to be nominated for the award in 1992, and deadmau5 was the first electronica artist to be nominated in 2012.

Recipients

Outstanding Performance (1972–1973)
In 1972 and 1973 only, awards were given for Outstanding Performance of the Year – Female and Outstanding Performance of the Year – Male in addition to those for Best Male Vocalist and Best Female Vocalist.

Male and Female Vocalists of the Year (1970–1998)

Best Male Vocalist and Best Female Vocalist (1999)

Best Male and Female Artists (2000–2001)

Best Artist (2002)

Artist of the Year (2003–present)

See also

List of Canadian musicians

References

Artist